Squalius platyceps is a species of ray-finned fish in the family Cyprinidae. It is found in the Drin drainage in Albania, Montenegro, and North Macedonia.

References

Squalius
Fish described in 2010